The following is a summary of Mayo county football team's 2016 season. It was a first season in charge for newly appointed Mayo manager Stephen Rochford.

Kits

Competitions

FBD League

Fixtures

Table

National Football League Division 1

Fixtures

Table

Connacht Senior Football Championship

Fixtures

Bracket

2016 All-Ireland Senior Football Championship

Fixtures

References

Mayo football season
Mayo county football team seasons